"When the Beat Drops Out" is a song by British/Vincentian musician Marlon Roudette from his second studio album, Electric Soul (2014). The song was written by Marlon Roudette and Jamie Hartman. It was released in Germany on 18 July 2014 as the lead single from the album. It was released in the United Kingdom on 1 March 2015.

"When the Beat Drops Out" has charted at number one in Germany, number two in Austria and Switzerland, and number 15 in Australia. It also debuted and peaked at number 7 in the United Kingdom.

Music video
A music video to accompany the release of "When the Beat Drops Out" was first released onto YouTube on 4 July 2014 at a total length of three minutes and forty-two seconds.

Track listing

Charts and certifications

Weekly charts

Year-end charts

Certifications

Release history

References

2014 songs
Marlon Roudette songs
Songs written by Jamie Hartman
Songs written by Marlon Roudette
Number-one singles in Germany